Leptomorphus hyalinus is a species of fungus gnats, insects in the family Mycetophilidae.

References

Mycetophilidae
Articles created by Qbugbot
Insects described in 1901